"Özgürlük İçimizde" ("Freedom Is Within Us") is a 2002 single by the Turkish pop singer Tarkan. It was released as part of Turkcell's advertising campaign and wasn't sold in stores separately. The campaign consisted of TV adverts, calendar and phone card designs, using the concept that a phone enables a person to travel free in nature and still keep in touch. This single was only released in cassette format.

Track listing
 Özgürlük İçimizde, 2002
 Özgürlük İçimizde Orijinal Versiyon (4:02)
 Özgürlük İçimizde Ozinga Alternatif Versiyon (3:22)

Personnel
Written by Tarkan
Ozan Çolakoğlu: Arrangement, keyboard, programming, record (1) and mix (1)
Murat Matthew Erdem: Record (2) and mix (2)
Ercan Irmak: Ney
Nurkan Renda: Guitars
Studio and record at Sarı Ev

Notes

External links
 Single and Song Lyrics Information in English

2002 singles
Tarkan (singer) songs
Songs written by Tarkan (singer)
Turkish-language songs
2002 songs